Batam Harbour Bay Ferry Terminal is an international transport hub with shopping and restaurants in the center of Batam, Indonesia. Located within Nagoya, Jodoh, it is 10 minutes drive away from Batam Nagoya city.

Since its opening in 2006, it has been serving an average of 45,000 visitors coming from Singapore every month. 

The ferry terminal is part of an integrated development by Citra Buana Prakarsa that includes  a hotel, shopping, entertainment, and apartments near the terminal.

On 2014 September 5 and 6, it hosted the 7th Asean Jazz Festival sponsored by the Ministry of Tourism and Creative Economy of the Republic of Indonesia in collaboration with the Keppri Regional Government and Batam City Government. The Jazz Festival is held to increase foreign tourist visits.

Ferry Schedule 

There is 12 daily voyage between Harbour Front Singapore to Harbour Bay Batam. Each trip lasts approx 45 minutes.

The terminal is served by Horizon Fast Ferry and Batam Fast that commutes between Singapore Harbourfront and Batam. 

Service also runs to nearby Rimau Island Karimun via MV Oceana Ferry.  or to Johor, Malaysia, Puteri Harbour Ferry Terminal, via Marine Hawk

Facilities 

Connected to the terminal is BayFront Mall, Harbour Bay Residences, a Marriott hotel and Harbour Bay Seafood area.

Events 
On 2014 September 5 and 6, it hosted the 7th Asean Jazz Festival sponsored by the Ministry of Tourism and Creative Economy of the Republic of Indonesia in collaboration with the Keppri Regional Government and Batam City Government. The Jazz Festival is held to increase foreign tourist visits.

References

External links 
 Harbour Bay
 Singapore Cruise Centre
 Harbour Bay Ferry - Timetables, prices and Harbour Bay ferry tickets at directferries.ie
 Marriott Hotel | P.T Citra Buana Prakarsa
 Hari Terakhir Liburan Akhir Tahun. Arus Penumpang di Sejumlah Pelabuhan Meningkat

Batam
Ferry terminals in Indonesia